Qarah Tulki or Qareh Tulki or Qareh Towlki, also rendered as Kara Tulki or Ghareh Tavakol, may refer to:
 Qarah Tulki-ye Olya
 Qarah Tulki-ye Tazehkand